The Western Pennsylvania Conference was a college football conference composed of member schools located in the state of Pennsylvania. The league existed from 1958 to 1967.

Champions

1958 – Westminster (PA)
1959 – Westminster (PA)
1960 – Westminster (PA)
1961 – Westminster (PA)

1962 – Westminster (PA)
1963 – Waynesburg and Westminster (PA)
1964 – Westminster (PA)

1965 – Waynesburg
1966 – Waynesburg
1967 – Waynesburg

See also
List of defunct college football conferences

References

Defunct college sports conferences in the United States